Midori Kahata (born ) was a Japanese group rhythmic gymnast. She represented her nation at international competitions. 

She participated at the 2010 Summer Youth Olympics.
She competed at world championships, including at the 2013 World Rhythmic Gymnastics Championships.

References

External links

1995 births
Living people
Japanese rhythmic gymnasts
Place of birth missing (living people)
Gymnasts at the 2010 Summer Youth Olympics
20th-century Japanese women
21st-century Japanese women